The Paramushir shrew (Sorex leucogaster) is a species of mammal in the family Soricidae. It is endemic to Russia. Its natural habitat is temperate forests. It is likely named for Paramushir Island, home to several other species of shrew in the genus Sorex.

References

 Insectivore Specialist Group 1996.  Sorex leucogaster.   2006 IUCN Red List of Threatened Species.   Downloaded on 30 July 2007.

Sorex
Mammals of Russia
Endemic fauna of Russia
Taxonomy articles created by Polbot
Mammals described in 1933
Taxa named by Nagamichi Kuroda